Ali İbrahim Ağaoğlu (born 3 March 1954) is a Turkish real estate developer and businessman, who has a net worth of $1.6 billion. He is the founder and chairman of the board of Ağaoğlu Group.

References

External links
 
 23 March 2016 Conference
 Interview: Ali Agaoglu, Agaoglu Group
 Forbes profile
 Forbes announces 100 richest Turks

1954 births
Living people
Turkish businesspeople
People from Of, Turkey
Turkish billionaires